Evangelical Lutheran Church in the Himalayan States is a Christian denomination in India. It has about 25,000 members. It belongs to the Lutheran World Federation.
Its president is Godwin Nag.
The other churches belonging to the United Evangelical Lutheran Church in India are:

Andhra Evangelical Lutheran Church
Arcot Lutheran Church
Evangelical Lutheran Church in Madhya Pradesh
Good Samaritan Evangelical Lutheran Church
Gossner Evangelical Lutheran Church in Chotanagpur and Assam
Indian Evangelical Lutheran Church
Jeypore Evangelical Lutheran Church
Northern Evangelical Lutheran Church
South Andhra Lutheran Church
Tamil Evangelical Lutheran Church

References

External links
Website of the United Evangelical Lutheran Church in India

See also
Adivasi
Christianity in India

Christianity in Assam
Lutheran World Federation members
Lutheranism in India
Evangelical denominations in Asia